Fernanda Raquel Borges Martins (born 26 July 1988) is a Brazilian athlete whose specialty is the discus throw. She represented her country at two consecutive World Championships, in 2013 and 2015, failing to qualify for the final on both occasions. She has won multiple medals on regional level.  In June 2021, she qualified to represent Brazil at the 2020 Summer Olympics.

Personal bests
Discus Throw: 64.66 –  Bragança Paulista, 15 September 2018

Competition record

References

External links
 

1988 births
Living people
Brazilian female discus throwers
World Athletics Championships athletes for Brazil
Athletes (track and field) at the 2011 Pan American Games
Athletes (track and field) at the 2015 Pan American Games
Athletes (track and field) at the 2019 Pan American Games
Pan American Games silver medalists for Brazil
Pan American Games medalists in athletics (track and field)
Pan American Games athletes for Brazil
People from Santa Cruz do Sul
Athletes (track and field) at the 2016 Summer Olympics
Olympic athletes of Brazil
South American Games silver medalists for Brazil
South American Games bronze medalists for Brazil
South American Games medalists in athletics
Competitors at the 2014 South American Games
Athletes (track and field) at the 2018 South American Games
Competitors at the 2011 Summer Universiade
Medalists at the 2019 Pan American Games
Athletes (track and field) at the 2020 Summer Olympics
Sportspeople from Rio Grande do Sul
21st-century Brazilian women